Mahabad (Tati: , mâhâ) is a village in Shahrabad Rural District, in the Central District of Firuzkuh County, Tehran Province, Iran. At the 2006 census, its population was 737, in 170 families. People of Mahabad belong to the Tat ethnic group and they speak the Tati language.

References 

Populated places in Firuzkuh County